Bjartmar Alv Gjerde (6 November 1931 – 28 November 2009) was a Norwegian politician for the Labour Party. He held several posts as a government minister between 1971 and 1980, and was Norway's first Minister of Petroleum and Energy. He was later the director-general of the Norwegian Broadcasting Corporation and director of the government agency Aetat.

Early life and career
Hailing from Larsnes in Sande, Møre og Romsdal, he was a son of smallholder Hjalmar Gjerde (1902–1979) and housewife Astrid Øvrelid (1907–1993). In his younger days he worked as a journalist, first in Sunnmøre Arbeideravis from 1948 to 1953 and then as editor-in-chief of Fritt Slag from 1953 to 1958. His only education beyond primary school was Sørmarka Folk High School in 1950. He also served in the Independent Norwegian Brigade Group in Germany. A newspaper article about alcohol drinking among brigade group officers in 1947 cost him fifteen days in military prison.

National politics
Gjerde was the chairman of Workers' Youth League from 1958 to 1961. From 1961 to 1962 he worked as a secretary for the Labour Party's parliamentary group, and from 1963 he worked as chief secretary in Arbeidernes Opplysningsforbund. He remained in this position—with interruptions—until 1981, and rejected offers to become both party secretary in 1969 and editor-in-chief of Arbeiderbladet in 1975.

As an elected politician he served as a deputy representative to the Parliament of Norway from Oslo during the term 1965–1969. He chaired Oslo's city chapter of the Labour Party from 1969 to 1972, and was a member of the central committee of the Labour Party from 1972 to 1981. During Trygve Bratteli's First and Second Cabinet, from 1972 to 1972 and 1973 to 1976, Gjerde was appointed as Minister of Education and Church Affairs. In Nordli's Cabinet he was given the Minister of Industry post, which he held until 11 January 1978 when he left to become the first Minister of Petroleum and Energy in Norway. He held the latter position until October 1980, when Arvid Johanson replaced him. His time was marked by several extraordinary incidents, including the Alta controversy and the Alexander Kielland rig disaster.

Later career
Gjerde was later director-general of the Norwegian Broadcasting Corporation from 1981 to 1989. From 1989 to 1995 he was director of Aetat (now a part of the Norwegian Labour and Welfare Service). He was a member of the Arts Council Norway from 1965 to 1985, and a board member of the Regional Development Fund from 1989 to 1992.

References

1931 births
2009 deaths
People from Sande, Møre og Romsdal
People from Møre og Romsdal
Norwegian expatriates in Germany
Labour Party (Norway) politicians
Norwegian Army personnel
Politicians from Oslo
Deputy members of the Storting
Government ministers of Norway
Petroleum and energy ministers of Norway
Directors of government agencies of Norway
NRK people
Norwegian television executives
20th-century Norwegian journalists
Ministers of Education of Norway
Ministers of Trade and Shipping of Norway